The 1856 United States presidential election in Massachusetts took place on November 4, 1856, as part of the 1856 United States presidential election. Voters chose 13 representatives, or electors to the Electoral College, who voted for president and vice president.

Massachusetts voted for the Republican candidate, John C. Frémont, over the Democratic candidate, James Buchanan, and the Know Nothing candidate, Millard Fillmore. Frémont won Massachusetts by a margin of 40.53%.

With 63.61% of the popular vote, Massachusetts would prove to be Frémont's second strongest state in the 1856 election after neighboring Vermont.

Results

See also
 United States presidential elections in Massachusetts

References

Further reading
 Baum, Dale. "Know-Nothingism and the Republican majority in Massachusetts: The political realignment of the 1850s." Journal of American History 64.4 (1978): 959-986. online
 Baum, Dale. The Civil War Party System: The Case of Massachusetts, 1848-1876 ( University of North Carolina Press, 1984).

Massachusetts
1856
1856 Massachusetts elections